Rajarsi Janakananda, born James Jesse Lynn (May 5, 1892 – February 20, 1955) was the leading disciple of the yogi Paramahansa Yogananda and a prominent businessman in the Kansas City, Missouri area. A self-made millionaire when he met Yogananda in 1932, he later left a total endowment of approximately six million dollars to Yogananda's organization, Self-Realization Fellowship(SRF)/Yogoda Satsanga Society of India(YSS), helping ensure its long-term success. Yogananda also chose Janakananda to succeed him as president of SRF/YSS. Janakananda was second president of SRF/YSS from 1952 until 1955.

Early life and career
James Jesse Lynn was born into relative poverty to Jesse William Lynn, an itinerant farmer, and Salethia Archibald Lynn near Archibald, Louisiana, in the southern part of the United States. His early childhood was spent helping the family pick cotton, milk cows, churn butter, and doing other family chores. His simple education began in a small log schoolhouse.

Leaving school at the age of fourteen, he began working for the Missouri Pacific Railroad, sweeping floors for $2 a month. He continued with various railroad jobs for a few years, quickly moving up to the position of chief clerk to the division manager in Kansas City, Missouri. In Kansas City, he took night classes to finish his high school education, at the same time that he took law and accounting classes.

At 21, he began working at the Bell Telephone accounting division and, before even graduating from law school, he was admitted to the Missouri bar. In 1913, he was married to Freda Josephine Prill of Kansas City. At age 24, Lynn took and passed the Missouri certified public accountant exam, earning the highest score on that exam ever made. Soon after, he began working for the largest underwriting insurance company in the country, U.S. Epperson, and quickly worked his way up in the company. By the age of 30, Lynn had taken out a significant and risky loan to buy the U.S. Epperson Underwriting Company. That step launched a successful business career that included insurance underwriting, oil well and orchard ownership, and large investments in the railroad business. He would become a prominent businessman in the Kansas City area as head of vast oil interests and as president of the world's largest reciprocal fire-insurance exchange.

Disciple of Paramahansa Yogananda
Lynn, "a self-made business magnate, was suffering from nervousness and dissatisfaction when he met Paramahansa Yogananda in Kansas City in 1932. Lynn later said of that meeting: 'I became aware that (for the first time in years) I was sitting very still... I had found entrance into a spiritual realm previously unknown to me.'" In spite of his material success, Lynn was unhappy, and acknowledged that he had a short temper and nervous problems. In January 1932, his life changed when he attended a series of classes given by Paramahansa Yogananda. Lynn felt instantly transformed in Yogananda’s presence:
On the second night of the class, I became aware that I was sitting upright, my spine straight and I was absolutely motionless. I looked down at my hands, which were so restlessly moving before and which were now perfectly still… I knew I had found the path that gave me inner peace and satisfaction and that I had found that something tangible I was seeking, a guru.

In Kansas City in 1932, following one of his lectures, Yogananda met Lynn privately. In January 1932 Yogananda initiated Lynn into Kriya Yoga, and he became a disciple. Because of bad publicity in the Kansas City area from his friendship with a previous Hindu teacher, Lynn and Yogananda agreed to avoid publicity regarding their association.
During the following twenty years, Lynn paid frequent visits to Yogananda at his Self-Realization Fellowship headquarters in Los Angeles, California. In 1935 when Yogananda was planning his trip to India, Lynn generously insisted on making a donation for his travels. While Yogananda was gone, Lynn purchased and built the large estate in Encinitas, California as a gift to Yogananda and his organization, Self-Realization Fellowship. Yogananda wrote in his Autobiography of a Yogi:During my stay in India and Europe (June 1935 – October 1936), Mr. Lynn had lovingly plotted with my correspondents in California to prevent any word from reaching me about the construction of the ashram in Encinitas. Astonishment, delight! Lynn eventually moved to an apartment in the Encinitas retreat/ashram center. The two spent long hours together over the years, meditating and discussing spiritual matters. Mr. Lynn said of his relationship with Yogananda:
"One of the blessings I have received in my friendship with Paramahansa Yogananda has been permanent relief from a state of nervousness, a state of strain, an inward state of uncertainty. I have gained calmness, peace, joy, and a sense of security that cannot come to anyone until he has found the true security of the soul." and "How heavenly is the company of a saint! Of all the things that have come to me in life, I treasure most the blessings that Paramahansaji has bestowed on me."

Yogananda lovingly referred to Lynn as "Saint Lynn" because of his great devotion to God. Yogananda said, "Some people say, 'The Western man cannot meditate.' That is not true. Since Lynn first received Kriya Yoga, I have never seen him when he was not inwardly communing with God." On August 25, 1951, Yogananda "bestowed on St. Lynn the monastic title of Rajarsi Janakananda (after the spiritually illustrious King Janaka of ancient India) and turned over to him the responsibility of guiding the SRF-YSS work." "Rajarsi is a spiritual title meaning royal rishi; Janakananda means the bliss of Janaka. Janaka was a great king as well as a fully Self-realized master of ancient India.” The name Rajarsi combines the Sanskrit words raja, which means king, and rsi/rishi, which means saint; thus the title Saint King. Yogananda said: "For you, St. Lynn, I interpret this title as 'king of the saints." In the book Rajarsi Janakananda, A Great Western Yogi there is further explanation and an illustration of Yogananda’s handwritten note of the word Rajarshi (Raja–rishi).

Mrinialini Mata said, in her talk The Blessings of Kriya Yoga in Everyday Life, "Guruji said that Rajarsi's role, even as Lahiri Mahasaya in India had demonstrated, was to be in the world but not of it: to show the effect that Kriya can have in those who carry worldly responsibilities as householders." Yogananda said that Janakananda was his most spiritually advanced disciple.

Yogananda wrote in his Autobiography of a Yogi: "An American businessman of endless responsibilities (as head of vast oil interests and as president of the world's largest reciprocal fire-insurance exchange), Lynn nevertheless finds time daily for long and deep Kriya Yoga meditation. Leading thus a balanced life, he has attained in samadhi the grace of unshakable peace."

After Yogananda’s death in March 1952, Janakananda became president of Self-Realization Fellowship and Yogoda Satsanga Society of India. Mrinalini Mata , former President of SRF/YSS, was quoted before Sri Daya Mata's death: "In India there is the spiritual tradition called guru-parampara – that is, the custom wherein the guru bestows his mantle of spirituality and authority on his successor. In Self-Realization Fellowship this continuity is certainly there. We have seen its unmistakable evidence in our revered Rajarsi Janakananda and Sri Daya Mata."

Janakananda died on February 20, 1955, in Borrego Springs, California.

See also
Autobiography of a Yogi
Kriya Yoga
Paramahansa Yogananda
Rajarshi
Self-Realization Fellowship
Sri Daya Mata
Yogoda Satsanga Society of India

References

External links

1892 births
1955 deaths
Businesspeople from Kansas City, Missouri
Devotees of Paramahansa Yogananda
American yogis
Kriya yogis